The 1921 World Greco-Roman Wrestling Championship were held in Helsinki, Finland.

Medal table

Medal summary

Men's Greco-Roman

References
FILA Database

World Wrestling Championships
W
W
International sports competitions in Helsinki
International wrestling competitions hosted by Finland
November 1921 sports events
1920s in Helsinki